George Alexander Gibson FRSE FRCPE (27 January 1854 – 18 January 1913) was a Scottish physician, medical author and amateur geologist. As an author he wrote on the diverse fields of both geology and heart disease. The Gibson Memorial Lecture is named after him. He was the first to discover a heart condition – the  Gibson Murmur – which is named after him.

Life

He was born at Kelliebank in Muckhart on 27 January 1854, the son of George Gibson, a solicitor based in Alloa, and his wife Jane Rae Brown. He was educated at Dollar Academy. He then studied law at both Glasgow University and Edinburgh University but instead chose to change his study to Medicine and graduated BSc in 1874. He won the Falconer Memorial Fellowship and graduated DSc in 1877 with a thesis on the old red sandstone of Shetland. He then undertook postgraduate studies in London, Dublin and Berlin, before gaining his MD from Edinburgh University in 1881.

After a very brief spell at Birmingham General Hospital he was appointed Senior Physician at the Royal Infirmary of Edinburgh on Lauriston Place. He also worked at the New Town Dispensary and Deaconess Hospital. He was elected a Fellow of the Royal Society of Edinburgh in 1881. His proposers were Sir William Turner, Daniel John Cunningham, Sir Archibald Geikie and Sir Charles Wyville Thomson. In 1910 he was elected a member of the Aesculapian Club.

In 1912 he spoke to the AGM of the British Medical Association on non-valvular cardiac disease.
In August 1912 he himself became a victim of cardiac disease, and his health broke. A cruise to Norway failed to revive his health. Despite complete rest his health went further into relapse at Christmas of 1912.

He died at home, 3 Drumsheugh Gardens, in Edinburgh's fashionable West End on the morning of Saturday 18 January 1913 and is buried in Dean Cemetery in the west of the city. The grave lies in  the northern extension backing onto the dividing wall to the original cemetery near its east  end.

After his death a campaign in the British Medical Journal quickly resulted in the foundation of the Gibson Memorial Lecture.

Family

He was married to Lucy Jane Philips (1847-1948) who lived to the age of 101.

Their son George Herbert Rae Gibson DSO FRCPE Croix de Guerre (1881-1932) followed in his father's footsteps as a doctor and was also a noted war hero. He was also author of the noted book Maple Leaves in Flanders Field.

Discoveries
Gibson Murmur, a heart condition which he first described, is named after him.

Publications

The Old Red Sandstone of Shetland (1877)
Cheyne-Stokes Respiration (1892)
Diseases of the Heart and Aorta (1898) Edinburgh: Young J. Pentland
Textbook of Medicine (c.1900) (2 volumes) Edinburgh: Young J. Pentland
 Gibson and Russell's Physical Diagnosis (1902) jointly with Dr William Russell. London, Edinburgh: Young J. Pentland
Nervous Affections of the Heart (1905) London, Edinburgh: Young J. Pentland
Memorials of Sir William Gairdner (1911)
Gibson contributed to the 1912 edition of the Oxford Dictionary of National Biography, the Edinburgh Medical Journal and Encyclopædia Britannica.

Other memberships

President of the Royal Medical Society 1877 aged only 23
President of the Dyslectic Society
Secretary of the Edinburgh branch of the British Medical Association
Secretary of the Medico-Chirurgical Society of Edinburgh
Secretary of the Royal College of Physicians of Edinburgh
Director of the Town and Gown Association
Correspondent Etranger d'Honneur de la Societe de Thirapeutique de Paris
Member of the Royal Company of Archers, the King's official bodyguard in Scotland. 
Examiner in Clinical Medicine at both Edinburgh and Oxford Universities.

References

Notes

Citations

1853 births
1913 deaths
Alumni of the University of Edinburgh
19th-century Scottish medical doctors
20th-century Scottish medical doctors
Fellows of the Royal Society of Edinburgh
Fellows of the Royal College of Physicians of Edinburgh
People educated at Dollar Academy